Lychnosea is a genus of moths in the family Geometridae erected by Augustus Radcliffe Grote in 1883.

Species
Lychnosea helveolaria (Hulst, 1881)
Lychnosea intermicata (Walker, 1862)

References

Ourapterygini